The Box is a 2021 thriller drama film directed by Venezuelan filmmaker Lorenzo Vigas. It was selected to compete for the Golden Lion at the 78th Venice International Film Festival and as the Venezuelan entry for the Best International Feature Film at the 95th Academy Awards.

Cast
 Hernán Mendoza
 Hatzín Navarrete
 Cristina Zulueta

Reception

See also
 List of submissions to the 95th Academy Awards for Best International Feature Film
 List of Venezuelan submissions for the Academy Award for Best International Feature Film

References

External links
 

2021 films
2021 drama films
2020s Spanish-language films
Venezuelan drama films

2021 thriller drama films
2021 thriller films